Lecithocera nitikoba is a moth in the family Lecithoceridae. It was described by Chun-Sheng Wu and You-Qiao Liu in 1993. It is found in Yunnan, China.

The wingspan is about 15 mm. The species resembles Lecithocera megalopis.

References

Moths described in 1993
nitikoba